Paramparça is a 1985 Turkish action film, directed by Halit Refiğ and starring Tarik Akan, Gülsen Bubikoglu, and Cüneyt Arkın.

References

External links

1985 films
Turkish action films
1985 action films
Films directed by Halit Refiğ